Siegfried Popper (5 January 1848, Prague – 19 April 1933, Prague) was an eminent naval architect in late-nineteenth- and early twentieth-century middle Europe.

Biography
Popper was born in Prague to Joachim Popper, a fine goods dealer (Galanteriewarenhandler) and Anna Schulhof. He attended the Nikolander Realschule (Technical School) before attending the Technical University in Prague for one year. He gained a degree in mechanical engineering after a three-year study at Karlsruhe Institute of Technology.

Naval career
Popper spent three years at various engineering works in Prague before joining the Austro-Hungarian Navy on 1 December 1869 as a draughtsman. He began working on ship design in 1887, when he prepared plans for the torpedo cruiser .  He rose to the rank of Schiffbau-General-Ingenieur (engineering admiral), a rank which was created for him and which was conferred on 30 April 1904. He was responsible for the design of all the ships of the navy built until his retirement on 1 April 1907. He was granted an honorary doctorate by Vienna University in 1916 and returned it, about 1930, when the university introduced "Numera Clausa". Kaiser Wilhelm II offered him a chair in naval architecture at the Technical University of Berlin at Charlottenburg, but Popper declined this offer. By the time he retired, Popper was in poor health. He was hard of hearing and his vision was poor.

After retiring from the navy he worked as a consultant for Stabilimento Tecnico Triestino (S.T.T.), at that time the only fabricator of large warships in the monarchy.

Retirement and death
After retirement Popper devoted much of his time to translating Hebrew literature into German. Because of his deafness he was run down by a tram in Prague and died several days later, on 19 April 1933.

References

1848 births
1933 deaths
Austro-Hungarian naval architects
Architects from Prague
Austro-Hungarian Navy officers